Eshkol Nevo (born 28 February 1971) is an Israeli writer who has published a collection of short stories, five novels and a work of non-fiction. One of his novels, Homesick, was awarded the Book Publishers Association Gold Prize (2005) and the FFI-Raymond Wallier Prize at the Salon du Livre (Paris, 2008). In 2008, Eshkol was awarded membership in the Israel Cultural Excellence Foundation (IcExcellence), one of the country's highest recognitions for excellence in the arts.

Life and career 

Eshkol Nevo grew up in Jerusalem, Haifa, and Detroit. He is the grandson of Israeli Prime Minister Levi Eshkol, for whom he was named. 

He studied copywriting at the Tirza Granot School and psychology at Tel Aviv University.

He teaches creative writing and thinking at the Bezalel Academy of Art and Design, Tel Aviv University, Sapir College and the Open University of Israel.

Works in Hebrew

Stories
Zimmer Be-Givatayyim (Bed & Breakfast), Zmora Bitan, 2001

Novels
Arbaa Batim ve-Gaagua (Homesick), Zmora Bitan, 2004 
Mishala Achat Yamina (World Cup Wishes), Kinneret Zmora-Bitan Dvir,  (965-517-274-0), 2007
Neuland, Zmora Bitan Publishing, 2011
Ha-Miqveh ha-Aharon be-Sibir (The Last Ritual Bathhouse in Siberia), Kinneret, Zmora-Bitan, Dvir, 2013
Shalosh Qomot (Three Stories), Zmora Bitan, 2015

For children
Aba shel Amaliya Nosea le-Australiya (Amalia's father travels to Australia), 2010

Nonfiction
Nifradnu Trach (The Breaking-Up Manual), Zmora Bitan, 2002

Works translated to English

Homesick, Chatto and Windus, trade paperback, paperback, 20 May 2008, translated by Sondra Silverston
World Cup Wishes, Chatto and Windus, trade paperback, 6 May 2010, translated by Sondra Silverston
Neuland, Chatto and Windus, trade paperback, paperback, 15 February 2014, translated by Sondra Silverston
Three Floors Up, Other Press LLC, 2017, translated by Sondra Silverston. ,

Works translated to German
Vier Häuser und eine Sehnsucht ("Homesick"), premium: Band 24564, paperback, translated by Anne Birkenhauer
Wir haben noch das ganze Leben ("World Cup Wishes"), paperback, translated by Markus Lemke
Die einsamen Liebenden ("The Last Ritual Bathhouse in Siberia"), translated by Anne Birkenhauer
Neuland, paperback, translated by Anne Birkenhauer
Über uns ("Three Floors Up"), translated by Markus Lemke

Works translated to French
Quatre maisons et un exil, Gallimard, January 2008, translated by Raïa Del Vecchio
Le cours du jeu est bouleversé, Gallimard, June 2010, translated by Jean-Luc Allouche
Neuland, Gallimard, May 2014, translated by Jean-Luc Allouche

References

External links

 https://web.archive.org/web/20080309154315/http://www.ithl.org.il/author_info.asp?id=401
 https://web.archive.org/web/20071206012306/http://www.ithl.org.il/book_info.asp?id=1012
 https://web.archive.org/web/20071206012833/http://www.ithl.org.il/book_info.asp?id=1151
 https://web.archive.org/web/20090106134453/http://www.ujia.org/jlec/goats-and-apples/1084/eshkol-nevo-homesick/
 http://www.ynetnews.com/articles/0,7340,L-3531987,00.html (Addicted to the Palestinians, article written by Eshkol Nevo) 
 http://www.mfa.gov.il/MFA/MFA+events/Around+the+world/France%20Israel%20Foundation%20bestows%20prizes%20on%20Israeli%20author%20and%20scientists%2010-Mar-2008 (Writer Eshkol Nevo and two Technion scientists to receive France-Israel Foundation prizes)

1971 births
Eshkol family
People from Jerusalem
Living people
Israeli novelists
Israeli male short story writers
Israeli short story writers
Tel Aviv University alumni